Dancetaria is the eighth studio album by French new wave band, Indochine.  It was released in 1999 and is the follow-up album to Wax. It is the band's first release since the death of Stéphane Sirkis on February 27, 1999.

Four of the songs on the album include guitar riffs composed by Stéphane Sirkis shortly before his death. The demos he had made were reused at the time of the final mix: he is quoted in the credits of the album as a guitarist, posthumously.

Track listing

Personnel 
Indochine
 Nicola Sirkis – vocals, guitars, backing vocals
 Stéphane Sirkis – guitars, Jaw's harp on "Stef II"
 Jean-Pierre Pilot – programmations, keyboards, pianos
 Boris Jardel – guitars
 Marc Éliard – bass
 Matthieu Rabaté – drums
 Olivier Gérard (oLi dE SaT) – arrangements, guitars, keyboards, sound effects

Production
 Phil Delire – engineer, mixing, montage
 Djoum – montage
 Gareth Jones – mixing
 peggy.m – concept
 Hervé Marignac – sound engineer
 Olivier Schultheis – orchestration

External links
 Detailed album information at www.indo-chine.org

References

1999 albums
Indochine (band) albums